|}

This is a list of House of Assembly results for the 1959 Tasmanian election.

Results by division

Bass

Braddon

Denison

Franklin

Wilmot

See also 

 1959 Tasmanian state election
 Members of the Tasmanian House of Assembly, 1959–1964
 Candidates of the 1959 Tasmanian state election

References 

Results of Tasmanian elections
1959 in Australia